Sa Sa International Holdings was a Hong Kong-based chain store company selling cosmetics, personal care, skin care, fragrance, hair care, body care products, as well as health and beauty supplements under more than 700 brands, including over 180 own brands and other exclusive international brands.

The company was founded by Kwok Siu-Ming in 1978. It was listed on the Hong Kong Stock Exchange in 1997. The chain had over 230 retail stores in Hong Kong, Macau, Mainland China and Malaysia. In 2019, Sa Sa closed all its 22 stores in Singapore amid stiff competition  and running losses for 6 consecutive years. Sa Sa management did not inform its staff about the plans to pull out and surprised many.

The Group has been included in the Hang Seng Composite SmallCap Index, Hang Seng Small Cap (Investable) Index, FTSE World Index Series and MSCI Index Series. It has been a constituent member of Hang Seng Corporate Sustainability Benchmark Index since 2011.

Sa Sa's annual revenue totaled HK$8,9 billion for the fiscal year ending in March 2015.

See also
 Bonjour Holdings

References

External links
 

Retail companies of Hong Kong
Cosmetics brands
Hong Kong brands
Companies listed on the Hong Kong Stock Exchange